George Frederick Meacham (July 1, 1831 - December 4, 1917) was an architect in the Boston, Massachusetts, area in the 19th century. He is notable for designing Boston's Public Garden, the Massachusetts Bicycle Club, and churches, homes, and monuments in greater Boston and elsewhere in New England.

Early life and career
George F. Meacham was born in 1831 in Watertown, Massachusetts to Giles A. and Jane A. Meacham. In 1849, after attending schools in Newton, Waltham and Cambridge, he entered Harvard College. He graduated in 1853. After college he trained and worked as a civil engineer, at one point working on the Water Works of Jersey City, New Jersey. In 1855 he entered the office of an unnamed architect in Boston. By 1857 he was associated with architect Shepard S. Woodcock, and by 1858 they had formed a partnership. Meacham established an independent firm in Boston in 1864.

Meacham was appointed architect of Boston's new Masonic Temple in 1866, after the health of the original architect, Merrill G. Wheelock, failed. Construction had begun in 1865, and Meacham completed the exterior of the building to Wheelock's design and was responsible for the design of the interior. The building was dedicated in 1867. It has been demolished. In 1867 a set of plans for an apartment house designed by Meacham was published in an overview of charity work in France, though it does not indicate whether it was intended to be built in France or Boston, where the book was printed. Meacham continued in Boston until 1891, when he retired from active practice. He continued to work on a few projects from his home in Newton in the following years.

Though most of Meacham's work was architectural, he did his best known work in the capacity of landscape architect. In 1859 his design was adopted for the reconstruction of the Public Garden, his plan for which has remained largely intact. He was also responsible, in 1865, for an extension to the Center Cemetery of Shirley, and for Farlow Park in Newton in 1882.

Personal life
In 1859 Meacham married Mary J. Warren of New Boston, New Hampshire. In 1870 they moved from Watertown to Newton. They had two children together, who both died in their youth. Mary J. Meacham died in 1877. Meacham remarried in 1881, to Ellen Louisa Frost, who survived him. Meacham died on December 4, 1917. At the time of his death he was a resident of Boston.

Legacy
Following his association with Woodcock, several architects who would become notable trained in his office. These include Henry M. Francis (1864-1865) and George R. Pyne (1870s).

Several of his works have been individually listed on the United States National Register of Historic Places.

Architectural works

References

Further reading 
 Curb, stone or fence: what is the best plan for enclosing the Common? Hearing on the Subject in the City Hall, Yesterday. Boston Daily Globe, May 26, 1875. p. 8.
 

Architects from Massachusetts
Architects from Boston
1831 births
1917 deaths
Harvard University alumni
People from Greater Boston
Monumental masons
American ecclesiastical architects
19th century in Boston
20th-century sculptors
19th-century sculptors
People from Watertown, Massachusetts